The Tooth of Time is a geological feature on the Philmont Scout Ranch located  southwest of Cimarron, New Mexico, United States, and is one of Philmont's most popular sights. It is an igneous intrusion of dacite porphyry formed in the Paleogene Period of the Cenozoic Era some 22-40 million years ago.

Santa Fe Trail
Both its pinkish-gray color and its unusual shape make it a particularly notable geological landmark. It was well known among the overland traders on the Santa Fe Trail, who used it to mark the final seven-day push to Santa Fe, New Mexico.

Geology
The Tooth was formed when magma from deep within the Earth rose through older rock layers and slowly cooled. Over many thousands of years, the older sedimentary rock eroded and left the harder igneous formation. The sedimentary rock acted as a mold for the intrusive magma, causing it to harden and cool where the sedimentary rock was strongest.

The Tooth sits atop a prominent ridge created through the process mentioned above. In the fourth episode of the TV mini-series western Lonesome Dove, the Tooth is readily visible as Pea Eye Parker, one of the protagonists, walks across the plain towards the cattle herd.

Climbing

The Tooth of Time is located on the east end of Tooth of Time Ridge, while Shaefer's Peak is located on the west end of the ridge. A trail extends about 3.5 miles from Shaefer's Pass to the Tooth Ridge campsite, located at the base of the Tooth of Time, with a short scramble ascending the Tooth. Another trail, known as the Stockade Trail, extends along the steeper back side and terminates at an animal stockade along a road. The first roped ascent of the main face was completed in July, 1972 by Lee Davis, Rick Barrett and Randy Wright.

See also

Baldy Mountain (Colfax County, New Mexico)
Mount Phillips (New Mexico)
Geography and ecology of Philmont Scout Ranch

References

External links
 Satellite image of Tooth Ridge
 Official website of Philmont Scout Ranch

Landforms of Colfax County, New Mexico
Cimarron, New Mexico
Rock formations of New Mexico
Santa Fe Trail